Ravine Des Casoars Wilderness Protection Area is a protected area located on the west end of Kangaroo Island in South Australia about  west of Kingscote. It was established in 1993 on land previously part of the Flinders Chase National Park.

Description

Location
It is located within the gazetted localities of Cape Borda and Flinders Chase.

Extent
The wilderness protection area occupies a parcel of land which is bounded to the south by the West Bay Road and the West Melrose Track, to the east by the West End Highway, the north in part by the Playford Highway and the remainder being the coastline down to mean low water mark from the cove known as Harvey's Return in the north-east to West Bay in the west. The coastline boundary, however, does exclude the former lighthouse reserve at Cape Borda which is part of the Flinders Chase National Park.

Protected area designation
The Wilderness Protection Area is classified as an IUCN Category Ib protected area.

History and prior use of land
The wilderness protection area was proclaimed on 15 October 1993, "in order to protect and preserve the outstandingly high wilderness qualities of the area." It was named after the Ravine des Casoars, a valley and associated drainage basin located in the northern half of the wilderness protection area. Previously, the land had been part of the Flinders Chase National Park and its predecessors since 1919. Prior to being part of a protected area, the land which had never been cleared by European colonists for agricultural or any other purpose appears to have supported Aboriginal people on the basis of archaeological evidence. As of 1999, radiocarbon dating of material recovered via archaeological excavation from sites at Cape du Couedic and Rocky River just outside the wilderness protection area's southern boundary suggest Aboriginal presence from approximately 7,500 years BP to as recent as 350–400 years BP.

Wilderness qualities
The following qualities have been identified by the government agency managing the wilderness protection area:
 The extensive woodlands and nature forests are virtually pristine. The area contains several complete natural drainage systems, from watershed to their discharge at sea. Wilderness quality is recorded as high over the entire area except where it is reduced in a narrow north-south band by the presence of Shackle Road, an unsealed public access road. The vegetation is biologically intact and many endemic plants are present.

Visitor services
The wilderness protected area can be visited on foot via the following walking and trekking trails which connect locations both in the wilderness protection area and the Flinders Chase National Park.

The ‘Return Road Hike’ is a walking trail of  length that starts at Harvey's Return and finishes at the Cape Borda Lightstation.

The ‘Flinders Chase Coastal Trek’ is a trekking trail between Cape du Couedic and the Ravine Des Casoars car park which located on the north side of the ravine at the southern end of Ravine Road. The trekking trail consists of three sections - Cape Du Couedic to Snake Lagoon (length of ), Snake Lagoon to West Bay (length of ) and West Bay to Ravine Des Casoars car park (length of ).

References

External links
Ravine des Casoars Wilderness Protection Area webpage on protected planet

Wilderness areas of South Australia
Protected areas of Kangaroo Island
Protected areas established in 1993
1993 establishments in Australia